KTUN (93.5 FM) is a radio station broadcasting a Spanish hits format. Licensed to New Castle, Colorado, United States, the station serves the Grand Junction Metropolitan Statistical Area.  The station is currently owned by Patricia MacDonald Garber and Peter Benedetti, through licensee Alwaysmountaintime, LLC.

References

External links

TUN
TUN
Radio stations established in 2005
2005 establishments in Colorado